The 703d Tactical Air Support Squadron is an inactive United States Air Force unit.  It was last assigned to the 507th Tactical Air Control Wing at Shaw Air Force Base, South Carolina, where it was inactivated in June 1988.

The squadron was first activated during World War II as the 703d Bombardment Squadron, Heavy in 1943. It trained with Consolidated B-24 Liberator bombers in the western United States before deploying to England.  There it engaged in air combat for eighteen months in the European Theater, earning the Distinguished Unit Citation and the French Croix de Guerre with Palm for its actions during the war.

Although inactivated at the end of the war, the squadron was activated in the reserves in 1948.  It apparently was not fully manned or equipped before it was inactivated when Continental Air Command reorganized its reserve units under the Wing Base organizational plan.

The 703d Tactical Air Support Squadron was activated as a forward air control (FAC) unit in Texas in 1967.  It became a special operations unit for two years before returning to its FAC mission, this time equipped with helicopters.  In 1985 USAF consolidated the two squadrons into a single unit.  The consolidated squadron was inactivated in 1988.

History

World War II
The 703d Bombardment Squadron was activated 1 April 1943 at Gowen Field in Idaho, where initial organization took place while key personnel traveled to Orlando AAB, Florida for training with the Army Air Forces School of Applied Tactics.   Both elements met at Wendover Army Air Field, Utah on 8 June 1943, where initial training with the Consolidated B-24 Liberator took place.  The squadron moved to Sioux City Army Air Base, Iowa in July 1943 to complete training.  At Sioux City, Iowa, actor Jimmy Stewart was assigned as the squadron's operations officer.  Capt Stewart then became the squadron commander. In September the squadron began to receive B-24H aircraft, the model of the Liberator they would fly in combat.

On 20 October 1943 the ground echelon moved to Camp Shanks, New York and embarked on the RMS Queen Mary on 26 October 1943, sailing next day. The unit arrived in the Firth of Clyde, Scotland on 2 November 1943 and disembarked at Gourock. The air echelon departed Sioux City late in October 1943 and flew to the United Kingdom via the southern route: Florida, Puerto Rico, Brazil, and West Africa.  Upon arrival, the squadron was stationed at RAF Tibenham as part of the 2nd Combat Bombardment Wing. The squadron was initially given a fuselage code of RN.

The 703d entered combat on 13 December 1943 by attacking U-boat installations at Kiel.   The unit operated primarily as a strategic bombardment organization until the war ended, striking such targets as industries in Osnabrück, synthetic oil plants in Lutzendorf, chemical works in Ludwigshafen, marshalling yards at Hamm, an airfield at Munich, an ammunition plant at Duneberg, underground oil storage facilities at Ehmen, and factories at Münster.

The squadron participated in the Allied campaign against the German aircraft industry during Big Week, from 20 to 25 February 1944, being awarded a Distinguished Unit Citation for attacking a Bf 110 aircraft assembly plant at Gotha on 24 February.  This was the longest running continuous air battle of World War II – some two and a half hours of fighter attacks and flak en route and leaving the target area.  Bomb damage assessment photographs showed that the plant was knocked out of production indefinitely.

The unit occasionally flew air interdiction and air support missions. It helped to prepare for the invasion of Normandy by bombing airfields, V-1 and V-2 launch sites, and other targets. It attacked shore installations on D-Day, 6 June 1944. and supported ground forces at Saint-Lô by striking enemy defenses in July 1944. During the Battle of the Bulge, between December 1944 and January 1945 it bombed German communications. Early on 24 March 1945 the 703d dropped food, medical supplies, and ammunition to troops that landed near Wesel during the airborne assault across the Rhine and that afternoon flew a bombing mission to the same area, hitting a landing ground at Stormede.

On occasion the unit dropped propaganda leaflets and hauled fuel to France. It was awarded the Croix de Guerre with Palm by the French government for operations in the theater from December 1943 to February 1945 supplying the resistance.

Probably, the 703d's most tragic mission is the attack on Kassel of 27 September 1944. After the bomb run, the group was alone in the skies and was attacked from the rear by an estimated 150 Luftwaffe planes, resulting in the most concentrated air battle in history. The Luftwaffe unit was a Sturmgruppe, a special unit intended to attack bombers by flying in tight formations of up to ten fighters in line abreast. This was intended to break the bomber formation at a single pass. The 361st Fighter Group intervened, preventing complete destruction of the group. Twenty-nine German and 25 American planes went down in a  radius. Only four of the 445th group's planes made it back to the base – two crashing in France, one in Belgium, another at RAF Old Buckenham. Two landed at RAF Manston. Only one of the 35 attacking aircraft was fit to fly next day.

After the end of the air war in Europe, the 703d flew low level "Trolley" missions over Germany carrying ground personnel so they could see the result of their efforts during the war. The group's air echelon departed Tibenham on 17 May 1945, and departed the United Kingdom on 20 May 1945. The ship arrived at New York on 8 June 1945. Personnel were given 30 days R&R. The squadron reestablished at Fort Dix, New Jersey, with the exception of the air echelon, which had flown to Sioux Falls Army Air Field, South Dakota. Most personnel were discharged or transferred to other units, and only a handful were left when the unit was inactivated on 12 September 1945.

Air Force reserve
The 703d Bombardment Squadron was activated again under Air Defense Command (ADC) in the reserves during the summer of 1947 at McChord Field, Washington, where it trained under the supervision of the 406th AAF Base Unit.   The squadron was reassigned to the 452d Bombardment Group in May in preparation for its July move to Fresno Air Terminal, California.   It was nominally a Boeing B-29 Superfortress very heavy bombardment squadron, although it is not certain that it was equipped or fully manned. In July 1948, Continental Air Command (ConAC) assumed reserve training responsibility from ADC.   After conducting training for two years, the squadron was inactivated in June 1949 when ConAC reorganized its combat units under the wing base organizational model and reserve flying operations at Fresno ended.

Tactical air support
The 703d Tactical Air Support Squadron was activated as a forward air control (FAC) unit in Texas in 1967, equipped with helicopters.  It became a special operations unit for two years before returning to its FAC mission.  It flew the Sikorsky CH-3E and tested the Sikorsky UH-60A Blackhawk helicopter for use as a possible replacement.  The squadron participated in numerous exercises.  Elements of the squadron deployed to Saudi Arabia in 1980 where they participated in the rescue of a downed McDonnell Douglas RF-4C crew.  In 1985 the two squadrons were consolidated into a single unit.  The squadron was inactivated in 1988.

Lineage
703d Bombardment Squadron
 Constituted as 703d Bombardment Squadron (Heavy) on 20 March 1943
 Activated on 1 April 1943
 Redesignated 703d Bombardment Squadron, Heavy on 20 August 1943
 Inactivated on 12 September 1945
 Redesignated 703d Bombardment Squadron, Very Heavy on 13 May 1947 and allotted to the reserve
 Activated on 1 January 1948
 Inactivated on 27 June 1949.
 Consolidated on 19 September 1985 with 703d Tactical Air Support Squadron as 703d Tactical Air Support Squadron

703d Tactical Air Support Squadron
 Constituted as 703d Tactical Air Support Squadron ca 13 February 1967
 Activated on 3 April 1967
 Redesignated 703d Special Operations Squadron on 1 April 1969
 Redesignated 703d Tactical Air Support Squadron (Helicopter) on 1 November 1971
 Consolidated on 19 September 1985 with 703d Bombardment Squadron
 Inactivated on 1 June 1988

Assignments
 445th Bombardment Group, 1 April 1943 – 12 September 1945
 445th Bombardment Group, 1 January 1948
 452d Bombardment Group, 28 May 1948 – 27 June 1949
 507th Tactical Control Group, 3 April 1967
 507th Tactical Control Group, 1 April 1969
 4471st Tactical Air Support Group, 1 July 1969
 68th Tactical Air Support Group, 1 January 1970
 507th Tactical Air Control Group  (later 507th Tactical Air Control Wing), 1 June 1974 – 1 June 1988

Stations
 Gowen Field, Idaho, 1 April 1943
 Wendover Field, Utah, 8 June 1943
 Sioux City Army Air Base, Iowa, 8 July 1943 – 20 October 1943
 RAF Tibenham, England (Station 124), 2 November 1943 – 30 May 1945
 Fort Dix Army Air Base, New Jersey, c. 9 June 145 – 12 September 1945
 McChord Air Force Base, Washington, 1 January 1948
 Fresno Air Terminal, California, 6 July 1948 – 27 June 1949
 Shaw Air Force Base, South Carolina, 3 April 1967 – 1 June 1988

Aircraft
 Consolidated B-24 Liberator, 1943–1945
 Sikorsky CH-3, 1967–1988

Awards and campaigns

See also

 B-24 Liberator units of the United States Army Air Forces
 List of United States Air Force helicopter squadrons

References

Notes

Bibliography

 
  (ISBN is for Revised edition published in 2010)

External links
 The Kassel Mission Historical Society: Dedicated to the 445th Bomb Group (retrieved August 16, 2013)
 Official website of the 445th Bomb Group

Military units and formations established in 1967
Tactical air support squadrons of the United States Air Force